Badlands National Park is an American national park located in southwestern South Dakota. The park protects  of sharply eroded buttes and pinnacles, along with the largest undisturbed mixed grass prairie in the United States. The National Park Service manages the park, with the South Unit being co-managed with the Oglala Lakota tribe.

The Badlands Wilderness protects  of the park's North Unit as a designated wilderness area, and is one site where the black-footed ferret, one of the most endangered mammals in the world, was reintroduced to the wild.

Authorized as Badlands National Monument on March 4, 1929, it was not established until January 25, 1939. Badlands was redesignated a national park on November 10, 1978. Under the Mission 66 plan, the Ben Reifel Visitor Center was constructed for the monument in 1957–58. The park also administers the nearby Minuteman Missile National Historic Site. The movies Dances with Wolves (1990) and Thunderheart (1992) were partially filmed in Badlands National Park.

This national park was originally a reservation of the Oglala Sioux Indians and spans the southern unit of the park. The area around Stronghold Table was originally Sioux territory, and is revered as a ceremonial sacred site rather than a place to live.

In 1868, at the Second Treaty of Fort Laramie, the United States assured the Sioux that the Badlands shall forever be the property of the Sioux. In 1889, however, the treaty was broken and the Badlands were confiscated by the United States and unilaterally incorporated into a national park.

At the end of the 19th century, the Sioux Indians used this area as the site of the Ghost Dance, a ceremony to revive the souls of buffalo and the dead. After the last ghost dance in 1890, the United States banned the ritual, but it was revived by the Red Power movement, a movement to restore Indian rights that began in the 1960s. In 1980, the U.S. Supreme Court awarded compensation to the Sioux for the abrogation of the 1868 treaty, but the Sioux did not accept the money.

History

Native Americans

For 11,000 years, Native Americans have used this area for their hunting grounds. Long before the Lakota were the paleo-Indians, followed by the Arikara people. Their descendants live today in North Dakota as a part of the Three Affiliated Tribes. Archaeological records combined with oral traditions indicate that these people camped in secluded valleys where fresh water and game were available year-round. Eroding out of the stream banks today are the rocks and charcoal of their campfires, as well as the arrowheads and tools they used to butcher bison, rabbits, and other game. From the top of the Badlands Wall, they could scan the area for enemies and wandering herds. If hunting was good, they might hang on into winter, before retracing their way to their villages along the Missouri River. The Lakota people were the first to call this place "mako sica", which translates to — literally — "badlands". Extreme temperatures, lack of water, and the exposed rugged terrain led to this name. French-Canadian fur trappers called it "les mauvaises terres pour traverser," or "bad lands to travel through." By one hundred and fifty years ago, the Great Sioux Nation consisting of seven bands including the Oglala Lakota, had displaced the other tribes from the northern prairie.

The next great change came toward the end of the 19th century as homesteaders moved into South Dakota. The U.S. government stripped Native Americans of much of their territory and forced them to live on reservations. In the fall and early winter of 1890, thousands of Native Americans, including many Oglala Sioux, became followers of the Indian prophet Wovoka. His vision called for the native people to dance the Ghost Dance and wear Ghost shirts, which would be impervious to bullets. Wovoka had predicted that the white man would vanish and their hunting grounds would be restored. One of the last known Ghost Dances was conducted on Stronghold Table in the South Unit of Badlands National Park. As winter closed in, the ghost dancers returned to Pine Ridge Agency. The climax of the struggle came in late December 1890. Headed south from the Cheyenne River, a band of Minneconjou Sioux crossed a pass in the Badlands Wall. Pursued by units of the U.S. Army, they were seeking refuge in the Pine Ridge Reservation. The band, led by Chief Spotted Elk, was finally overtaken by the soldiers near Wounded Knee Creek in the Reservation and ordered to camp there overnight. The troops attempted to disarm Big Foot's band the next morning. Gunfire erupted. Before it was over, nearly three hundred Indians and thirty soldiers lay dead. The Wounded Knee Massacre was the last major clash between Plains Indians and the U.S. military until the advent of the American Indian Movement in the 1970s, most notably in the 1973 standoff at Wounded Knee, South Dakota.

The U.S. government and the Oglala Lakota Nation have agreed that this is a story to be told by the Oglala of Pine Ridge and Minneconjou of Standing Rock Reservation. The interpretation of the site and its tragic events are held as the primary responsibility of these survivors.

Fossil record

The history of the White River Badlands as a significant paleontological resource goes back to the traditional Native American knowledge of the area. The Lakota found large fossilized bones, fossilized seashells and turtle shells. They correctly assumed that the area had once been under water, and that the bones belonged to creatures which no longer existed. Paleontological interest in this area began in the 1840s. Fossils were occasionally collected, and in 1843 a fossilized jaw fragment collected by Alexander Culbertson of the American Fur Company found its way to a physician in St. Louis by the name of Hiram A. Prout.

In 1846, Prout published a paper about the jaw in the American Journal of Science in which he stated that it had come from a creature he called a Paleotherium. Shortly after the publication, the White River Badlands became popular fossil hunting grounds and, within a couple of decades, numerous new fossil species had been discovered in the White River Badlands. In 1849, Dr. Joseph Leidy published a paper on an Oligocene camel and renamed Prout's Paleotherium, Titanotherium prouti. By 1854 when he published a series of papers about North American fossils, 84 distinct species had been discovered in North America – 77 of which were found in the White River Badlands. In 1870 a Yale professor, O. C. Marsh, visited the region and developed more refined methods of extracting and reassembling fossils into nearly complete skeletons. From 1899 to today, the South Dakota School of Mines has sent people almost every year and remains one of the most active research institutions working in the White River Badlands. Throughout the late 19th century and continuing today, scientists and institutions from all over the world have benefited from the fossil resources of the White River Badlands. The White River Badlands have developed an international reputation as a fossil-rich area. They contain the richest deposits of Oligocene mammals known, providing a glimpse of life in the area 33 million years ago.

List of fossil animals

Homesteading

Aspects of American homesteading began before the end of the American Civil War; however, it did not affect the Badlands until the 20th century. Then, many hopeful farmers traveled to South Dakota from Europe or the eastern United States to try to seek out a living in the area. In 1929, the South Dakota Dept. of Agriculture published an advertisement to lure settlers to the state. On this map they called the Badlands, "The Wonderlands", promising "...marvelous scenic and recreational advantages". Being in a semi-arid, wind-swept environment, this proved far too little land to support a family. Cattle grazed the land, and crops such as winter wheat and hay were cut annually. However, the Great Dust Bowl events of the 1930s, combined with waves of grasshoppers, proved too much for most of the settlers of the Badlands. Houses, built of sod blocks and heated with buffalo chips, were abandoned.

Military use of Stronghold District 

This land was used extensively from 1942 through 1945 as an air-to-air and air-to-ground gunnery range including both precision and demolition bombing exercises. After the war, portions of the bombing range were used as an artillery range by the South Dakota National Guard. In 1968, most of the range was declared excess property by the USAF. Although  were retained by the USAF (but are no longer used) the majority of the land was turned over to the National Park Service.

Firing took place within most of the present-day Stronghold District. Land was bought or leased from individual landowners and the Tribe in order to clear the area of human occupation. Old car bodies and 55 gallon drums painted bright yellow were used as targets. Small automatic aircraft called "target drones" and  screens dragged behind planes served as mobile targets. Today, the ground is littered with discarded bullet cases and unexploded ordnance.

In the 1940s, 125 families were forcibly relocated from their farms and ranches, including Dewey Beard, a survivor of the Wounded Knee Massacre. Those that remained nearby recall times when they had to dive under tractors while out cutting hay to avoid bombs dropped by planes miles outside of the boundary. In the town of Interior, both a church and the building housing the current post office were struck by six inch (152 mm) shells through the roof. Pilots operating out of Ellsworth Air Force Base near Rapid City found it a real challenge to determine the exact boundaries of the range. There were no civilian casualties. However, at least a dozen flight crew personnel lost their lives in plane crashes.

The Stronghold District also known as the South Unit of Badlands National Park, consists of lands on the Pine Ridge Indian Reservation owned by the Oglala Sioux Tribe and managed by the National Park Service under an agreement with the Tribe. The land is a  area. Deep draws, high tables and rolling prairie are characteristic of these lands occupied by the earliest plains hunters, the paleo-Indians, and the Lakota Nation.

Legislative and administrative history
On March 4, 1929, his final day in office, President Calvin Coolidge signed Public Law No. 1021.  This bill authorized creation of the Badlands National Monument in South Dakota. The legislation's conditions for eventual proclamation included the acquisition of privately owned land within the proposed boundaries of the monument and the construction of a 30-mile highway through the park. The Badlands National Monument became the seventy-seventh monument within the National Park Service a decade after its original authorization, when President Franklin D. Roosevelt signed the enacting proclamation on January 24. 1939. The 10-year period, 1929–1939, to create the park matched the period of time that Mount Rushmore National Memorial was being blasted and sculptured; the Badlands work was part of a comprehensive federal drive to develop western South Dakota for tourism. The monument was renamed “Badlands National Park” in 1978.

The Badlands National Monument was established in order to preserve the natural scenery and educational resources within its boundaries. The bill authorized specific scientific and educational institutions to excavate within the monument in the pursuit of educational, geological, and zoological observation. The bill includes a portion highlighting the potential for fossil excavation in the monument's geological formations.

Badlands National Park Superintendents

 John E. Suter (1949–1953)
 John A. Rutter (1953–1957)
 George H. Sholly (1958–1959)
 Frank E. Sylvester (1960–1960)
 John W. Jay (1960–1962)
 Frank A. Hjort (1963–1967)
 John R. Earnst (1967–1970)
 Cecil D. Lewis, JR (1970–1974)
 James E. Jones (1974–1979)
 Gilbert E. Blinn (1979–1985)
 James L. Monheiser (1985–1985)
 Donald A. Falvey (1985–1987)
 Lloyd P. Kortge (1987–1987)
 Irvin L. Mortenson (1987–1996)
 Bill Supernaugh (1997–2004)
 Paige Baker (2005–2010)
 Eric Brunnemann (2010–2015)
 Mike Pflaum (2015–)

Wildlife
Animals that inhabit the park include: badger, bighorn sheep, bison, black-billed magpie, black-footed ferret, black-tailed prairie dog, bobcat, coyote, elk, mule deer, pronghorn, prairie rattlesnake, porcupine, whooping crane, swift fox, and white-tailed deer.

In 1963, 50 bison from Theodore Roosevelt National Park were released. The herd has grown to over 1,200 animals. The Bighorn sheep population has increased over the last couple years to a total of 233.

Endangered species 

The black-footed ferret and whooping crane are on the endangered species list.  The black-footed ferret population inside the Badlands National Park has recovered to a population of approximately 100 individuals. This whooping crane population in the Badlands National Park is considered a non-self-sustaining wild population.

Vegetation inventory 
Twenty-three vegetation map classes and ten Anderson Level II land-use classes were used for interpretation of approximately 1.3 million acres encompassing the park (approximately 242,755 acres) and surrounding environs.

A prairie is a large, open expanse of grasslands. A mixed-grass prairie is a grassland where grasses of many different heights grow. Mixed-grass prairies are the transition between eastern tall-grass prairies, where more rainfall means that taller grasses can grow, and western short-grass prairies, where the dry environment favors shorter grasses. In mixed-grass prairies, such as the grasslands surrounding Badlands National Park, grasses can range in height from ankle-high to waist-high. Although trees, shrubs, and forbs grow in the Badlands, grasses dominate the landscape. The most common grass in the park is Western Wheatgrass, which grows one to three feet tall and is the state grass of South Dakota.

Visitor services

Badlands National Park has two campgrounds for overnight visits - Cedar Pass and Sage Creek Campgrounds. Cedar Pass lodge offers accommodations in modern cabins and full-service dining. The Ben Reifel Visitor Center within the park offers a bookstore, special programs, and museum exhibits. The White River Visitors center in the park's South Unit offers information about the region's Lakota heritage.

The Badlands Wildnerness covers about one fourth of the park and was designated in 1976. There are no designated trails and camping is permitted anywhere in what is considered to be the largest undisturbed mixed-prairie rangeland remaining in the U.S. As this wilderness is managed by the National Park Service, hunting is not permitted. U.S. Wilderness Areas do not allow motorized or mechanized vehicles, including bicycles. Although camping and fishing are allowed with proper permit, no roads or buildings are constructed and there is also no logging or mining, in compliance with the 1964 Wilderness Act.

Climate 
According to the Köppen climate classification system, Badlands National Park has a hot-summer humid continental climate (Dfa).

Gallery

Current issues and challenges
Badlands National Park has been impacted by the rise of oil and gas pipelines/drilling, the debate over Native American land rights, fossil loss due to criminal activity, and climate change.

Oil pipelines/drilling
The Badlands National Park faces growing encroachment from oil and gas companies hoping to transport fossil fuels throughout regions of South Dakota. Pipelines are associated with environmental risks; breaches and or breaks in the system have the potential to negatively impact the quality of life for surrounding ecosystems and wildlife. Additionally, the Badlands is quickly being surrounded by drilling and fracking projects.

Challenges to land rights
The Badlands National Park also faces debate over the federal claims to the land once inhabited by the Oglala Lakota Sioux tribe. Supporters of Oglala Sioux reparations argue against the U.S. government's seizure and management over sacred Native American land. The Badlands National Park began taking steps to reserve part of the park's southern unit for management by the tribe's members, creating jobs and returning ownership to those re-located out during America's Manifest Destiny, however this creation of the “Tribal National Park” has yet to come to pass.

Fossil depletion
The Badlands National Park was first established as a national monument in order to protect the abundance of fossils within the land's natural stone structures. Since the park's founding, visitors and fossil poachers/hunters have been looting the park's fossils to keep for sentimental and scientific value or to sell for profit.

Climate change
By 2050, the NPS predicts that Badlands National Park will have different conditions than are currently felt in the park—including increasing or decreasing temperatures, changes in quantity of total spring precipitation, potential delays in the start of spring within the park, and various increasing frequencies of heavy precipitation events. Widespread summer drought is projected to be more likely in South Dakota within the same time frame (2050). On average, the counties of Oglala, Pennington, and Jackson (the three main counties that Badlands National Park occupies) have seen a gradual shift of monthly and annual temperatures between 1901 and 2021, leading to a warmer, drier environment.

Current climate predictions developed by the NPS have allowed Badlands National Park to develop several management techniques preparing for different climate scenarios, categorized as "no-gainer", "no-regrets", or "no-brainer" management styles. According to the NPS Climate Scenarios brief for Badlands National Park, a "no-gainer" is a current action that is not likely to achieve desired outcomes in any given future scenario. A "no-regrets" management style implements new actions that are likely to be successful in management of all potential future scenarios. "No-brainer" management involves maintaining current management practices that are likely to be beneficial, but aren't necessarily ideal. Climate Change management within the park primarily focuses on native vegetation, bison populations, species rehabilitation, archeological and paleontological preservation, and infrastructure and geohazards. Management plans for these values are primarily under the categories "no-regrets" and "no-brainer".

See also
List of national parks of the United States

References

External links

 Badlands National Park – National Park Service website
 Geology of Badlands National Park – United States Geological Survey
 
 Badlands Bombing Range – United States Army Corps of Engineers

 
Badlands of the United States
National parks in South Dakota
Archaeological sites in South Dakota
Oligocene mammals
Protected areas of Jackson County, South Dakota
Protected areas of Pennington County, South Dakota
Protected areas of Oglala Lakota County, South Dakota
Protected areas established in 1939
1939 establishments in South Dakota
Paleontology in South Dakota
Nature centers in South Dakota